Aphonopelma peloncillo is a species of spider in the family Theraphosidae, found in the United States (Arizona and New Mexico).

References

peloncillo
Spiders of the United States
Spiders described in 2016